The Kottonmouth Xperience Vol. II: Kosmic Therapy is a 2-disc CD/DVD combo of remixed classic Kottonmouth Kings tracks.

Track listing
 Intro - 0:57
 Echoes and Spirit Guides - 3:10
 Super Duper High - 5:05
 Growin Ganja - 3:09
 Keep Smilin - 3:51
 New Weed Order - 3:27
 Smoked Out - 3:54
 Down That Road - 3:31
 Somewhere Between Nowhere - 4:40
 Sunsplash - 2:51
 Radical Habits - 2:48
 Still Ballin - 3:53
 Dragon Slayer - 2:53
 Ride Or Die - 3:24
 Freedom Time - 4:00
 Krazy Train - 2:47
 Stoner Dub - 5:22

Release Date: July 2, 2008

Chart positions

References

2008 remix albums
Kottonmouth Kings albums